Money and Power: How Goldman Sachs Came to Rule the World is the third book written by William D. Cohan. It chronicles the history of Goldman Sachs, from its founding to the subprime mortgage crisis of 2008. First published as hardcover on March 29, 2011, the book has been reprinted soon thereafter on April 12, 2011, by Doubleday again. The text has been reprinted as paperback on January 10, 2012, by Penguin Books.

Book's Content 

A longer excerpt of Money and Power is provided by Random House.

Reviews 
Reviews on William D. Cohan's Money and Power have appeared in Businessweek, The Economist, Financial Times, The Guardian, Mail on Sunday, New York Times Book Review and others.

References

External links

Reviews, discussions, interviews in chronological order 
Book Review: Money and Power: How Goldman Sachs Came to Rule the World by William D. Cohan, by N.N., Bloomberg Businessweek Magazine, April 6, 2011; access: October 1, 2013   
 Diving in Search of the ‘Great Vampire Squid’, by Janet Maslin, New York Times, April 11, 2011; access: October 1, 2013
Long on chutzpah, short on friends - Goldman Sachs, The Economist, April 16, 2011, page 88; access: October 1, 2013
How Goldman Sachs Beat the Bubble, by Paul M. Barrett, New York Times Sunday Book Review, April 29, 2011; access: October 1, 2013
Myth-breaker charts the tarnishing of the Goldman image - William Cohan, author of a new book on Goldman Sachs, says the bank will take years to reinstate its reputation, The Guardian, April 29, 2011; access: October 1, 2013
After Words interview with Cohan on Money and Power by Patrice Hill, chief economics correspondent for the Washington Times, May 14, 2011 (61-minutes-video); access: October 1, 2013
 Book Review: Money and Power, The Banker, Bankers Anonymous, July 15,  2012; access: October 1, 2013 
Goldman Sachs - Der Finanzsupermarkt.  Documentation in 11 partitions (online-videos, overall time 72 minutes) on Goldman & Sachs by the European TV-Channel Arte, August 30, 2013, in German language. This documentation is partly based on the critical views of William D. Cohan, which he revealed also in his book Money and Power. Access: October 1, 2013
 Goldman Sachs - Eine Bank lenkt die Welt Video documentation (72 minutes), Arte, September 24, 2013, in German language. This documentation is partly based on the critical views of William D. Cohan, which he revealed also in his book Money and Power. It was at first released on August 30, 2012. Only available online in Germany because of provisions of the law. Access: October 1, 2013.

Related Articles in Chronological Pear 
William Cohan Interview on Goldman Sachs - William Cohan, author of "Money and Power: How Goldman Sachs Came to Rule the World" and a Bloomberg Television contributing editor, talks about Goldman Sachs's position on mortgage securities before the market's collapse. Cohan speaks with Erik Schatzker and Deirdre Bolton on Bloomberg Television's "InsideTrack.", Bloomberg TV, June 13, 2011; access: October 1, 2013  
The Financial Crisis: Five Years Later - How Goldman Sachs Made Money Mid-Crisis, by William Cohan, Bloomberg Businessweek, September 12, 2013; access: October 1, 2013

Related Literature 
Claudia Honegger, Sighard Neckel, Chantal Magnin: Strukturierte Verantwortungslosigkeit - Berichte aus der Bankenwelt, edition suhrkamp 2607, Frankfurt/Main: Suhrkamp, 2010 ; access: October 2, 2013

Works about the subprime mortgage crisis
Books about traders
Finance books
Books about companies
2009 non-fiction books
Business books
Doubleday (publisher) books
Penguin Books books
Goldman Sachs
Bear Stearns
JPMorgan Chase